Rastafari is a studio album by American jazz trumpeter Wadada Leo Smith with the Bill Smith ensemble, which was released in 1983 on the Canadian Sackville label. The trumpeter considers the recording a cooperative effort, it is Bill Smith, co-founder of Sackville and producer of the album, who made it a "Leo Smith record". It was reissued on CD in 2003 with new artwork by Boxholder.

Reception

In his review for AllMusic, Scott Yanow states "The playing by these adventurous musicians is advanced and quite free on the four group originals, and all five players share equally in the creation of these fresh explorations."

Track listing
 "Rastafari" (Wadada Leo Smith) - 7:30
 "Rituals" (Bill Smith) - 11:56
 "Madder Lake" (David Prentice) - 11:05
 "Little Bits" (Bill Smith) - 9:10

Personnel
Wadada Leo Smith - trumpet, flugelhorn, percussion, harmonica
Bill Smith - soprano sax, sopranino sax, alto clarinet 
David Prentice - violin
David Lee - bass, cello
Larry Potter - vibraphone

References

1983 albums
Wadada Leo Smith albums
Sackville Records albums